Hossank ('Current') was an Armenian language Menshevik daily newspaper published from Tiflis 1906-1907. It was the sole Menshevik daily in Armenian language. the newspaper was published by Zurabov, A. Yerzinkian and K. Samuelian. 87 issues of Hossank was published.

References

Mass media in Tbilisi
Publications established in 1906
Publications disestablished in 1907
Socialist newspapers
Armenian-language newspapers
1906 establishments in the Russian Empire